Didymoplexiella is a genus of flowering plants from the orchid family, Orchidaceae. It contains 8 known species native to Southeast Asia, with a few species extending northwards into Japan and southern China. These are mycoheterotropic plants lacking chlorophyll, obtaining nutrients from fungi in the soil.

Didymoplexiella borneensis (Schltr.) Garay - Sarawak
Didymoplexiella cinnabarina Tsukaya, M.Nakajima & H.Okada - Kalimantan
Didymoplexiella denticulata Aver. - Laos, Vietnam
Didymoplexiella forcipata (J.J.Sm.) Garay - Kalimantan
Didymoplexiella kinabaluensis (Carr) Seidenf. - Sabah
Didymoplexiella ornata (Ridl.) Garay - Thailand, Vietnam, Malaysia, Borneo, Sumatra 
Didymoplexiella siamensis (Rolfe ex Downie) Seidenf. - Hainan, Taiwan, Japan, Ryukyu Islands, Thailand, Vietnam
Didymoplexiella trichechus (J.J.Sm.) Garay - Sumatra, Bangka

See also 
 List of Orchidaceae genera

References 

  2005. Handbuch der Orchideen-Namen. Dictionary of Orchid Names. Dizionario dei nomi delle orchidee. Ulmer, Stuttgart
  (2006) Epidendroideae (Part One). Genera Orchidacearum 4: 441 ff. Oxford University Press.

External links 
 
IOSPE orchid photos, Didymoplexiella siamensis 
Swiss Orchid Foundation at the Herbarium Jany Renz, Didymoplexiella ornata 
Thai Native Orchids, วันจันทร์ที่ 16 กุมภาพันธ์ พ.ศ. 2552, Didymoplexiella siamensis 
Nature Campus, 自然觀察  植物觀察, Didymoplexiella siamensis 錨柱蘭 
Ministry of Natural Resource and Environment, Thailand, ฐานข้อมูลพรรณไม้ องค์การสวนพฤกษศาสตร์, BGO Plant Database, The Botanical Garden Organization, กล้วยส้มสยาม, Didymoplexiella siamensis (Rolfe) Seidenf.

Gastrodieae
Gastrodieae genera